A-84543 is a drug developed by Abbott, which acts as an agonist at neural nicotinic acetylcholine receptors with high selectivity for the α4β2 subtype. It is widely used in scientific research into the structure and function of this receptor subtype and has been the lead compound for the development of a large family of related derivatives.

References 

Nicotinic agonists
Aromatic ethers
3-Pyridyl compounds
Pyrrolidines
Stimulants